The Northwestern Bulgarian dialects are two closely related dialects of the Bulgarian language, which are located west of the yat boundary and thus are part of the Western Bulgarian dialects. The range of the dialects includes most of northwestern Bulgaria, to the west of the line between Nikopol, Pleven and Mezdra and to the north of the line between Vratsa and Belogradchik. They bear strong resemblance to their neighbouring Eastern Bulgarian dialects and with some exceptions, mainly the pronunciation of yat, have the same phonological and morphological features as the neighbouring subdialects of the Eastern Bulgarian Central Balkan dialect.

Phonological and morphological characteristics
 
 Old Church Slavonic ѣ (yat) is always pronounced as  instead of formal Bulgarian я/е (~) – бел/бели 
 Vocalic r and l for Old Church Slavonic ръ/рь and лъ/ль instead of the combinations ръ/ър (~) and лъ/ъл (~) in Standard Bulgarian - дрво, слза instead of дърво, сълза (tree, tear). However, there are words where the schwa is pronounced as in Standard Bulgarian - връх, слънце (summit, sun)
 ending e instead of formal Bulgarian i for plural past active aorist participles (биле instead of били)

Most other phonological and morphological features of the Northwestern Bulgarian dialects are similar to the characteristics of the Eastern Bulgarian dialects and the formal language: щ~жд (~) for Proto-Slavic ~ and Old Church Slavonic щ~жд (~), ъ for both Old Church Slavonic ѫ (yus) and ъ, vowel reduction, etc.

References
Стойков, Стойко: Българска диалектология, Акад. изд. "Проф. Марин Дринов", 2006 

Dialects of the Bulgarian language